Moshirabad-e Owriyeh (also Romanized as Moshīrābād-e Owrīyeh and Moshīrābād-e Āveryeh; also known as Moshīrābād, Mūsherābād, and Mūshīrābād) is a village in Badr Rural District, in the Central District of Qorveh County, Kurdistan Province, Iran. At the 2006 census, its population was 184, in 41 families. The village is populated by Kurds.

References 

Towns and villages in Qorveh County
Kurdish settlements in Kurdistan Province